The  Annie Award for Outstanding Achievement for Voice Acting in a Feature Production (or Annie Award for Outstanding Achievement for Voice Acting in an Animated Feature Production) is an Annie Award awarded annually to the best animated feature film and introduced in 1998 rewarding voice acting for animated feature films.

History
Awards for voice acting were awarded at the Annie Awards previously to 1998, but the category was a catch-all for film and television. The award as it is now was divided in two separate sub-categories for males and females in 1998, 2000, and 2001. It was called Outstanding Individual Achievement for Voice Acting in an Animated Feature Production from 1998 to 2001, and Outstanding Voice Acting in an Animated Feature Production from 2002 to 2004.

At the 33rd Annual Awards, Wallace & Gromit: Curse of the Were-Rabbit was the only film that had multiple nominations without any other films being nominated.

So far, the only tie in this category happened in the 44th Annual Awards with both Auliʻi Cravalho (Moana) and Jason Bateman (Zootopia) sharing the prize.

In 2019, Josh Gad became the category's first two-time winner, when the actor won for his vocal portrayal of Olaf in Frozen II, having previously won for voicing the character in 2013 for Frozen.

Winners and nominees

1990s
Best Achievement in Voice Acting

 Outstanding Individual Achievement for Voice Acting in an Animated Feature Production

2000s
{| class="wikitable" style="width:90%;" 
|-
! style="width:3%;"| Year
! style="width:15%;"| Recipient
! style="width:15%;"| Character(s)
! style="width:25%;"| Film
|-
! rowspan="11" style="text-align:center;"| 2000 (28th)
|-
| colspan="3"|Outstanding Individual Achievement in Voice Acting By a Male Performer in an Animated Feature Production
|-
|style="background:#FAEB86;" |Tim Allen
|style="background:#FAEB86;" |Buzz Lightyear
|style="background:#FAEB86;" |Toy Story 2
|-
| Armand Assante
| Tzekel-Kan
| The Road to El Dorado
|-
| Bill Farmer
| Goofy
| An Extremely Goofy Movie
|-
| Nikita Hopkins
| Roo
| The Tigger Movie
|-
| Maurice LaMarche
| The Brain
| Wakko's Wish
|-
| colspan="3"|Outstanding Individual Achievement in Voice Acting By a Female Performer in an Animated Feature Production
|-
|style="background:#FAEB86;" |Joan Cusack
|style="background:#FAEB86;" |Jessie
|style="background:#FAEB86;" |Toy Story 2
|-
|Tress MacNeille
|Dot
|Wakko's Wish
|-
| Della Reese
| Eema
| Dinosaur
|-
! rowspan="13" style="text-align:center;"| 2001 (29th) 
|-
| colspan="3"|Outstanding Individual Achievement in Voice Acting By a Male Performer in an Animated Feature Production
|-
|style="background:#FAEB86;" |Eddie Murphy
|style="background:#FAEB86;" |Donkey
|style="background:#FAEB86;" |Shrek
|-
| Mark Hamill
| The Joker
| Batman Beyond: Return of the Joker
|-
| Patrick Warburton
| Kronk Pepikrankenitz
| The Emperor's New Groove
|-
| Leonard Nimoy
| Kashekim Nedakh
| Atlantis: The Lost Empire
|-
| William Shatner
| Mayor Phlegmming
| Osmosis Jones
|-
| colspan="3"|Outstanding Individual Achievement in Voice Acting By a Female Performer in an Animated Feature Production
|-
|style="background:#FAEB86;" |Eartha Kitt
|style="background:#FAEB86;" |Yzma
|style="background:#FAEB86;" |The Emperor's New Groove
|-
| Jodi Benson
| Lady
|rowspan=2|Lady and the Tramp II: Scamp's Adventure
|-
| Alyssa Milano
| Angel
|-
| Florence Stanley
| Mrs. Packard
| Atlantis: The Lost Empire
|-
| Tara Strong
| Melody
| The Little Mermaid II: Return to the Sea
|-
! rowspan="6" style="text-align:center;"| 2002 (30th)
|-
|style="background:#FAEB86;" |Daveigh Chase 
|style="background:#FAEB86;" |Lilo Pelekai
|style="background:#FAEB86;" |Lilo & Stitch|-
| Corey Burton
| Captain Hook
| Return to Never Land
|-
| Tim Hodge
| Khalil
| Jonah: A VeggieTales Movie
|-
| Brian Murray
| John Silver
|rowspan=2|Treasure Planet
|-
| Emma Thompson
| Captain Amelia
|-
! rowspan="6" style="text-align:center;"| 2003 (31st) 
|-
|style="background:#FAEB86;" |Ellen DeGeneres|style="background:#FAEB86;" |Dory|style="background:#FAEB86;" |Finding Nemo|-
| Joe Alaskey
| Daffy Duck
| Looney Tunes: Back in Action
|-
| Jim Cummings
| Kaa
| The Jungle Book 2
|-
| Miyoko Shōji
| Chiyoko Fujiwara
| Millennium Actress
|-
| Jeremy Suarez
| Koda
| Brother Bear
|-
! rowspan="6" style="text-align:center;"| 2004 (32nd) 
|-
|style="background:#FAEB86;" |Brad Bird|style="background:#FAEB86;" |Edna Mode|style="background:#FAEB86;" |The Incredibles|-
| Tony Anselmo
| Donald Duck
| rowspan="2"|Mickey, Donald, Goofy: The Three Musketeers
|-
| Rob Paulsen
| The Troubadour
|-
| Antonio Banderas
| Puss in Boots
| Shrek 2
|-
| Samuel L. Jackson
| Lucius Best / Frozone
| The Incredibles
|-
! rowspan="5" style="text-align:center;"| 2005 (33rd) 
|-
|style="background:#FAEB86;" |Peter Sallis|style="background:#FAEB86;" |Wallace|style="background:#FAEB86;" |Wallace & Gromit: The Curse of the Were-Rabbit|-
| Helena Bonham Carter
| Lady Campanula Tottington
|rowspan=3|Wallace & Gromit: The Curse of the Were-Rabbit
|-
| Ralph Fiennes
| Victor Quartermaine
|-
| Nicholas Smith
| Reverend Clement Hedges
|-
! rowspan="6" style="text-align:center;"| 2006 (34th) 
|-
|style="background:#FAEB86;" |Ian McKellen|style="background:#FAEB86;" |The Toad|style="background:#FAEB86;" |Flushed Away|-
| Maggie Gyllenhaal
| Zee
|rowspan=3|Monster House
|-
| Sam Lerner
| Chowder
|-
| Spencer Locke
| Jenny
|-
| Wanda Sykes
| Stella
| Over the Hedge
|-
! rowspan="6" style="text-align:center;"| 2007 (35th) 
|-
|style="background:#FAEB86;" |Ian Holm|style="background:#FAEB86;" |Skinner|style="background:#FAEB86;" |Ratatouille|-
| Janeane Garofalo
| Colette Tatou
| rowspan="2"|Ratatouille
|-
| Patton Oswalt
| Remy
|-
| Julie Kavner
| Marge Simpson
| The Simpsons Movie
|-
| Patrick Warburton
| Ken
| Bee Movie
|-
! rowspan="6" style="text-align:center;"| 2008 (36th)  
|-
|style="background:#FAEB86;" |Dustin Hoffman|style="background:#FAEB86;" |Master Shifu|style="background:#FAEB86;" |Kung Fu Panda|-
| Ben Burtt
| WALL-E / M-O
| WALL-E
|-
| James Hong
| Mr. Ping
|rowspan=2|Kung Fu Panda
|-
| Ian McShane
| Tai Lung
|-
| Mark Walton
| Rhino
| Bolt
|-
! rowspan="6" style="text-align:center;"| 2009 (37th) 
|-
|style="background:#FAEB86;" |Jennifer Cody|style="background:#FAEB86;" |Charlotte La Bouf|style="background:#FAEB86;" |The Princess and the Frog|-
| Dawn French
| Miss Forcible
| Coraline
|-
| Hugh Laurie
| Dr. Cockroach Ph.D
| Monsters vs. Aliens
|-
| John Leguizamo
| Sid
| Ice Age: Dawn of the Dinosaurs
|-
| Jenifer Lewis
| Mama Odie
| The Princess and the Frog
|-
|}

2010s

2020s

 Multiple wins 2 wins'''

 Josh Gad

References

External links 
 Annie Awards: Legacy

Annie Awards
Awards established in 1998
Voice acting awards